Muhammad Irfan Saeed Bhatti (born 18 November 1992) is a Pakistani badminton player. He competed at the 2014 and 2018 Commonwealth Games. He was the men's doubles champion at the 2016 All Pakistan National ranking tournament. He also the runner-up at Pakistan International tournament in the singles and doubles events. Teamed-up with Azeem Sarwar, they won the men's doubles title at the Nepal Annapurna International Badminton Championship. He was the bronze medalists at the 2016 South Asian Games in the men's singles and team events.

Achievements

South Asian Games 
Men's singles

BWF International Challenge/Series 
Men's singles

Men's doubles

Mixed doubles

  BWF International Challenge tournament
  BWF International Series tournament
  BWF Future Series tournament

References

External links 
 

Living people
1992 births
Racket sportspeople from Lahore
Pakistani male badminton players
Badminton players at the 2014 Commonwealth Games
Badminton players at the 2018 Commonwealth Games
Badminton players at the 2022 Commonwealth Games
Commonwealth Games competitors for Pakistan
Badminton players at the 2014 Asian Games
Badminton players at the 2018 Asian Games
Asian Games competitors for Pakistan
South Asian Games bronze medalists for Pakistan
South Asian Games medalists in badminton